This is a list of the Australian species of the family Brachodidae. It also acts as an index to the species articles and forms part of the full List of moths of Australia.

Brachodinae
Euthorybeta ochroplaca Turner, 1913
Euthorybeta xanthoplaca Turner, 1913
Miscera ambigua (Turner, 1942)
Miscera ampla (Turner, 1942)
Miscera androgyna Turner, 1913
Miscera basichrysa (Lower, 1916)
Miscera centropis Meyrick, 1907
Miscera conspersa (Turner, 1942)
Miscera desmotoma (Lower, 1896)
Miscera episcota (Lower, 1903)
Miscera holodisca Meyrick, 1907
Miscera homotona (Swinhoe, 1892)
Miscera isomacha (Meyrick, 1925)
Miscera leucopis Meyrick, 1907
Miscera lygropis Turner, 1913
Miscera mesochrysa (Lower, 1903)
Miscera micrastra Meyrick, 1907
Miscera omichleutis Meyrick, 1907
Miscera orthaula Meyrick, 1907
Miscera pammelas Turner, 1913
Miscera resumptana Walker, 1863
Synechodes coniophora Turner, 1913

Phycodinae
Nigilgia adjectella Walker, 1863

External links 
Brachodidae at Australian Faunal Directory

Australia